San Jerónimo (the Spanish name of Saint Jerome) may refer to the following:

Argentina
 San Jerónimo Department, Santa Fe
 San Jerónimo Sud, San Lorenzo Department, Santa Fe

Colombia
 San Jerónimo, Antioquia

Guatemala
 San Jerónimo, Baja Verapaz

Honduras
 San Jerónimo, Comayagua
 San Jerónimo, Copán

Mexico
 San Jerónimo Lídice, a neighborhood of Mexico City
 San Jerónimo, Chihuahua
 San Jerónimo, Guanajuato
 San Jerónimo (Los Barbosa), Jalisco
 San Jerónimo, Zacatecas
 San Jerónimo Coatlán, Oaxaca
 San Jerónimo de Juárez, Guerrero
 San Jerónimo Silacayoapilla, Oaxaca
 San Jerónimo Sosola, Oaxaca
 San Jerónimo Taviche, Oaxaca
 San Jerónimo Tecoatl, Oaxaca
 San Jerónimo Tlacochahuaya, Oaxaca
 San Jerónimo Tecuanipan, Puebla
 San Jerónimo Xayacatlán, Puebla
 San Jerónimo River, a tributary of the Balsas River

Peru
 San Jerónimo District (disambiguation), several districts in Peru

Spain
 San Jeronimo el Real (Royal Church, Madrid)

See also
San Geronimo (disambiguation)